Meleri Mullan (born 14 June 2000) is an Australian professional women's footballer who last played as a forward for Adelaide United in the W-League.

She is known for the local soccer's fastest in the Women's National Premier League 2019 for the FFSA NTC women's team with a speed of 10.04

Club career

Adelaide United
After playing at the FFSA NTC, Mullan joined W-League club Adelaide United in October 2018. She played her first game with Adelaide United in a 0–0 draw against Melbourne Victory coming on as a substitute for Emily Condon.

Adelaide University
In March 2019, Mullan left the W-League and joined Adelaide University.

Salisbury Inter
In March 2020, Mullan joined Salisbury Inter.

Return to Adelaide United
In December 2020, Mullan returned to Adelaide United after scoring 3 goals in 17 appearances for Salisbury Inter in the 2020 Women's NPL.

References

External links
 Meleri Mullan

2000 births
Living people
Adelaide United FC (A-League Women) players
A-League Women players
Women's association football forwards
Australian women's soccer players